Eesterga is a small village in De Fryske Marren in the province of Friesland, the Netherlands. It had a population of around 45 in 2017.

History
The village was first mentioned in 1505 as Eestergae. The etymology is unclear. It used to have a church, but it was demolished in 1740. In 1840, it was home to 143 people.

Before 2014 it was part of the Lemsterland municipality.

Gallery

References

De Fryske Marren
Populated places in Friesland